Waldemar Carlsen (29 February 1880 – 28 August 1966) was a Norwegian novelist, newspaper editor and politician for the Labour and Communist parties.

He was born in Kristiania, and moved to Solør at a young age. He was the editor-in-chief of local labour newspaper Solungen from 1910 to 1913, and then applied for jobs in other newspapers, such as the editorship in Demokraten in June 1913. He did not prevail there, but edited Fremover from 1913 to 1916 and Glomdalens Arbeiderblad from 1916 to 1925. Glomdalens Arbeiderblad became affiliated with the Communist Party in 1923. Carlsen remained in the editor chair until he quit his job in 1925 because he did not receive wages anymore. The newspaper was declared bankrupt in 1926 and disappeared in 1927.

He unsuccessfully stood for parliamentary election as the deputy candidate of Fredrik Monsen in the constituency Hamar og Kongsvinger in 1918, then as a ballot candidate in the Market towns of Hedmark and Oppland counties in 1921 for Labour and 1924 for the Communists. He was a member of the executive committee of Kongsvinger city council. In the 1930s he was a travelling agitator, and founded many trade unions. He was also active in the temperance movement. He also published several novels, such as Dragsug (1910), Orion (1911) and Jernnæven (1913), and the travelogue Herjetog i syd og nord (1919). He spent his last working years as a school janitor in Kongsvinger. He died in 1966.

References

1880 births
1966 deaths
People from Solør
Politicians from Kongsvinger
Norwegian newspaper editors
20th-century Norwegian novelists
Labour Party (Norway) politicians
Communist Party of Norway politicians
Hedmark politicians
Norwegian temperance activists
Place of death missing